Acheng may refer to:

Acheng District, in Harbin, Heilongjiang, China
Angelina Acheng, Ugandan human rights activist
Ah Cheng, Chinese author and screenwriter